Justice Wiggins may refer to:
David Wiggins (jurist) Justice of the Iowa Supreme Court
Charles K. Wiggins Justice of the Washington Supreme Court